The 2021 African Movie Academy Award ceremony was held on Sunday 28 November 2021 at the Marriott Hotel in Lagos Nigeria.

Submissions for consideration for the awards were held between 31 May and 31 July 2021. Over 500 films were submitted for consideration.

The nominees in 26 categories were announced in a ceremony held at Ebony Life Place, Victoria Island Lagos, on Friday 29 October 2021 by the head of the jury, Steve Oluseyi Ayorinde. The Somalian movie, Gravedigger’s Wife received the highest number of nominations including Best Film in African Language, Best Actor in a Leading Role, and Best Director. Other nominated films include Omo Ghetto: The Saga, Ayinla and Eyimofe. Oluwabamike Olawunmi-Adenibuyan, a former housemate in Big Brother Naija was nominated in the Best Young/Promising Actor category for her role in the movie Collision Course.

Awards

References 

2021 in Nigeria
21st century in Lagos
Africa Movie Academy Awards ceremonies
Events in Lagos
2021 film awards